Marcil is a surname. Notable people with the surname include:

Brian Marcil (born 1948), Canadian football player
Champlain Marcil (1920–2010), Canadian photojournalist
Charles Marcil (1860–1937), Canadian politician
Chris Marcil, American television writer and producer
Claude Marcil (born 1964), Canadian fencer
Serge Marcil (1944–2010), Canadian educator and politician
Simon Marcil, Canadian politician
Vanessa Marcil (born 1968), American actress
William C. Marcil (born 1936), American media executive